Lewisburg is a borough in Union County, Pennsylvania, United States,  south by southeast of Williamsport and  north of Harrisburg. In the past, it was the commercial center for a fertile grain and general farming region. The population was 5,158 as of the 2020 census. It is the county seat of Union County. Located in central Pennsylvania's Susquehanna River Valley, on the West Branch Susquehanna River, Lewisburg is northwest of Sunbury. It is home to Bucknell University and is near the Lewisburg Federal Penitentiary. Its 19th-century downtown is on the National Register of Historic Places. Lewisburg is the principal city of the Lewisburg, PA Micropolitan Statistical Area, and is also part of the larger Bloomsburg-Berwick-Sunbury, PA Combined Statistical Area.

History
Lewisburg was founded in 1785 by Ludwig Derr. A settler of the area (since as early as 1763–1769), Derr had purchased several tracts of land from the William Penn family and other neighboring land owners, the largest of which was known as "The Prescott". Having been on the land for such a long time, Derr had befriended the local Native Americans of the area. His relationship with these indigenous peoples was so well founded that, even as many of the other local settlers' homesteads were routinely sacked by Native Americans, Derr's lands remained free from attacks. Subsequently, in 1784, he worked with Samuel Weiser to lay out his combined land tracts, and create Derrstown. The name was later changed to Lewisburgh when Snyder County was created from Union County in 1855    (according to a local Keystone marker sign), but was known on original plans and deeds as Lewisburg before that time (also see note below).

Much has been considered regarding 'how' the name changed from Derrstown to Lewisburg. The most likely truth is that Derr's first name "Ludwig" translated into English as "Louis" but, being of German descent, it was spelled "Lewis". Later, after Derr's death, the traditional Germanic "burgh" was appended to his first name to create Lewisburgh.

Note: U.S. Postal Service records contradict this story. The post office was named Lewisburgh when it was established in 1796; in 1893, the name was shortened to Lewisburg.

The street names that run east and west are a local urban mystery. St. George, St. Catherine, and St. Louis etc. appear to be named for saints. While Lutherans, such as Derr was, recognize historic catholic saints, the street names are more likely named for Derr's family members (whose names coincided with saints). Those streets are consecutively parallel, and emanate from what was then Derr's home, and the location of the first available lot sold (which were both situated on, what is now,  Mill Street). George was Ludwig's son, his wife Catherine and Ludwig/Lewis (sic) himself. The other original street names that still exist are St. John, St. Mary and St. Anthony, which may be the names of other children from families with whom Derr's own family were friends. However, there is an indication that Derr also had a daughter named Mary. Overall, however, the premise is further supported by the notion that the German word for street is Strasse (Straße, abbreviated St). At the time, street names were pronounced as Strasse Mary or Strasse George. Later, when signs were made to note the street names, the abbreviation for Strasse was allowed to remain, but the US/English abbreviation was redundantly added to the signs.

The second mystery surrounding Lewisburg is the disappearance of its founder Ludwig Derr. After selling several lots of land, Derr set off for Philadelphia to sell additional lots. Shortly after arriving, records indicate some of his lots had sold. However, Ludwig Derr simply disappears from history in that city. Derr's son George went to Philadelphia to search for his father, but returned a short time later, unsuccessful.

Over the centuries, Lewisburg has been a center of commerce in Union County. The West Branch Susquehanna River was used for logging and shipping, and remains of old factories and other ancient stone structures exist along the river banks. Prior to, and during, the Civil War, many abolitionists lived in the area, and several locations within the town of Lewisburg served as stopping points on the famous Underground Railroad.

The Lewisburg Historic District, Chamberlin Iron Front Building, Packwood House-American Hotel, and Reading Railroad Freight Station are listed on the National Register of Historic Places.

Geography
Lewisburg is located at  (40.963895, -76.888154).

Demographics

As of the census of 2000, there were 5,620 people, 1,778 households, and 787 families residing in the borough. The racial makeup of the borough was 91.57% White, 2.62% African American, 0.19% Native American, 2.79% Asian, 0.11% Pacific Islander, 1.00% from other races, and 1.74% from two or more races. Hispanic or Latino of any race were 2.33% of the population.

There were 1,778 households, out of which 17.5% had children under the age of 18 living with them, 33.7% were married couples living together, 8.5% had a female householder with no husband present, and 55.7% were non-families. 42.9% of all households were made up of individuals, and 16.6% had someone living alone who was 65 years of age or older. The average household size was 1.97 and the average family size was 2.64.

In the borough the population was spread out, with 10.0% under the age of 18, 45.9% from 18 to 24, 16.4% from 25 to 44, 12.8% from 45 to 64, and 14.8% who were 65 years of age or older. The median age was 22 years. For every 100 females, there were 87.3 males. For every 100 females age 18 and over, there were 84.3 males.

The median income for a household in the borough was $30,137, and the median income for a family was $53,409. Males had a median income of $32,727 versus $25,436 for females. The per capita income for the borough was $14,146. About 6.3% of families and 22.2% of the population were below the poverty line, including 12.9% of those under age 18 and 6.2% of those age 65 or over.

Parks and recreation

Hufnagle Park is located along Bull Run Creek in the heart of downtown. It offers open space, a picnic pavilion, playground equipment, and gardens. It is named in honor of former Public Safety Director Gordon Hufnagle. Officer Hufnagle died saving lives during the Agnes Flood on June 21, 1972.  A covered footbridge just north of the park was built in his honor in 1982.

Hufnagle Park is a terminus of the Buffalo Valley Rail Trail. The 9.5-mile trail runs westward from Lewisburg to Mifflinburg following the rail bed of the Lewisburg & Tyrone Railroad, which was decommissioned in 1982. In 2009, the Buffalo Valley Recreation Authority acquired the right of way to the entire West Shore railroad which runs from Mifflinburg to Northumberland. The rail trail opened in 2011 and was extended in 2015. 

The Lewisburg Community Garden is a joint venture between Lewisburg Borough and Bucknell University. Opened in 2012, the community garden provides educational opportunities for students and area residents, rents garden plots, and grows and donates 3,800 pounds of organic produce to local food access programs.

Other parks in the borough are: Soldier's Memorial Park and Mariah's Garden (both located on the Susquehanna River), Lewisburg Area Recreation Park, Wolfe Field and St. Anthony Street Park, and D.F. Green Field.

Notable people
Ward R. Bliss, Pennsylvania State Representative (1889-1905)
Thaddeus Mortimer Fowler, Cartographer who lived in Lewisburg between 1881 and 1885.
Jason Bohn, professional golfer, was born in Lewisburg in 1973
Doug Lebda, founder and CEO of LendingTree, was born and raised in Lewisburg.

Gallery

References

External links

 

Pennsylvania populated places on the Susquehanna River
County seats in Pennsylvania
Populated places established in 1784
Boroughs in Union County, Pennsylvania
1784 establishments in Pennsylvania
Populated places on the Underground Railroad